Charles St. John (October 8, 1818 – July 6, 1891) was a representative in the US House of Representatives from New York.

Biography
St. John was born on October 8, 1818, in Mount Hope, New York. He attended the common schools and Goshen and Newburgh (New York) Academies. He engaged in lumbering on the Delaware River and in mercantile pursuits and banking at Port Jervis, New York. He served as internal revenue collector and later as president of the Barrett Bridge Co..

St. John was elected as a Republican to the Forty-second and Forty-third Congresses (March 4, 1871 – March 3, 1875), after which he resumed his former business activities.

He died in Port Jervis on July 6, 1891, and was interred in Laurel Grove Cemetery.

Legacy
In 1888 St. John built the High Point Inn at New Jersey's highest point High Point, New Jersey.  The Inn would form the basis for the home of Anthony R. Kuser who converted it into a lodge before ultimately donating it to New Jersey in 1923.

References

External links

 

1818 births
1891 deaths
Republican Party members of the United States House of Representatives from New York (state)
People from Mount Hope, New York
19th-century American politicians